The 2016–17 Presbyterian Blue Hose men's basketball team represented Presbyterian College during the 2016–17 NCAA Division I men's basketball season. The Blue Hose, led by 28th-year head coach Gregg Nibert, played their home games at the Templeton Physical Education Center in Clinton, South Carolina as members of the Big South Conference. They finished the season 5–25, 1–17 in Big South play to finish in last place. They lost in the first round of the Big South tournament to Campbell.

Head coach Gregg Nibert resigned on April 12, 2017 after 28 seasons at Presbyterian, and was replaced by Wofford assistant Dustin Kerns on May 22.

Previous season
The Blue Hose finished the 2015–16 season 11–20, 5–13 in Big South play to finish a four-way tie for eighth place. They defeated Radford in the first round of the Big South tournament before losing in the quarterfinals to Winthrop.

Roster

Schedule and results

|-
!colspan=9 style=| Exhibition

|-
!colspan=9 style=| Non-conference regular season

|-
!colspan=9 style=| Big South regular season

|-
!colspan=9 style=| Big South tournament

References

Presbyterian Blue Hose men's basketball seasons
Presbyterian